Polish Radio Katowice is the largest regional station of Polish Radio. It was created in 1927. It can be received in the Silesian Voivodeship and bordering entities.

External links
 Homepage

1927 establishments in Poland
Polskie Radio
Mass media in Katowice
Radio stations established in 1927